Manchester is a city in Northwest England.  The M20 postcode area of the city includes the suburbs of Didsbury and Withington.  This postcode area contains 65 listed buildings that are recorded in the National Heritage List for England.  Of these, four are listed at Grade II*, the middle of the three grades, and the others are at Grade II, the lowest grade.  The area is mainly residential, and most of the listed buildings are houses and associated structures.  The other listed buildings include churches and structures in churchyards, hotels and public houses, civic buildings, buildings in the Didsbury Campus of Manchester Metropolitan University, a former hospital and its lodges, banks, a clock tower, a milestone, and a war memorial.


Key

Buildings

References

Citations

Sources

Lists of listed buildings in Greater Manchester
Buildings and structures in Manchester